The Poverty of Riches is a 1921 American silent drama film directed by Reginald Barker and starring Richard Dix, Leatrice Joy and Louise Lovely. It was based on a 1914 short story by Leroy Scott.

Cast
 Richard Dix as John Colby
 Leatrice Joy as Katherine Colby
 John Bowers as Tom Donaldson
 Louise Lovely as Grace Donaldson
 Irene Rich as Mrs. Holt
 DeWitt Jennings as Lyons
 Dave Winter as Stephen Phillips
 Roy Laidlaw as Hendron
 John Cossar as Edward Phillips Sr
 Frankie Lee as John (in prologue)
 Dorothy Hughes as Katherine (in prologue)

References

Bibliography
 Goble, Alan. The Complete Index to Literary Sources in Film. Walter de Gruyter, 1999.

External links
 

1921 films
1921 drama films
1920s English-language films
American silent feature films
Silent American drama films
Films directed by Reginald Barker
American black-and-white films
Goldwyn Pictures films
1920s American films
English-language drama films